Garcia Hernandez, officially the Municipality of Garcia Hernandez,  is a 4th class municipality in the province of Bohol, Philippines. According to the 2020 census, it has a population of 24,430 people.

The town is home to the sacred burial cave of Kalagan.

Geography

Barangays
Garcia Hernandez comprises 30 barangays:

Climate

Demographics

Economy

Parishes

 Saint John the Baptist
 Saint Isidore the Farmer

Gallery

References

External links
 [ Philippine Standard Geographic Code]
Municipality of Garcia Hernandez

Municipalities of Bohol